Murder Will Out may refer to:

Murder Will Out (1899 film), a lost 1899 French silent film by Georges Méliès
Murder Will Out (1930 film), a 1930 American drama film starring Jack Mulhall
Murder Will Out (1939 film), a 1939 British crime film starring Jack Hawkins
The Voice of Merrill, 1952 British film released under this title in the U.S.
"Murder Will Out", a sequence in the 1930 film revue Paramount on Parade
Murder Will Out, original title of an English adaptation of the 1814 French play The Dog of Montarges
Murder Will Out, an 1860 novel by Elizabeth Caroline Grey
Murder Will Out, a 1932 mystery novel by Murray Leinster (as Will F. Jenkins)
"Murder Will Out": The Detective in Fiction, a 1990 book by T. J. Binyon